Euryops evansii is a species of flowering plant in the family Asteraceae found in South Africa and Lesotho. It has multiple yellow flowers and grows as a shrub.

References

evansii